Prairietown may refer to:
Prairietown, Illinois, a community in Madison County, Illinois
Prairietown, West Virginia, a community in Cabell County, West Virginia